Alexander Baillie (born 6 January 1956) is an English cellist, recognised internationally as one of the finest of his generation. He is currently professor of cello at the Bremen Hochschule and previously taught at Birmingham Conservatoire, as well as at various summer schools in the UK and Europe. He is one of the main cello professors at the Cadenza Summer School, and also runs an annual cello summer course in Bryanston.

Early life
Alexander was born in Stockport, England, and started learning the cello at the late age of twelve, after having been inspired by seeing Jacqueline du Pré perform. He advanced very quickly and gained a place at the Royal College of Music at the age of 16, studying 'cello under Anna Shuttleworth and Joan Dickson. After leaving the RCM, he studied for three years under André Navarra at the Vienna Hochschule. Other cellists he received tuition from included Mstislav Rostropovich and the cellist who inspired him to begin playing, Jacqueline du Pré.

Career
Baillie frequently appears as a concerto soloist all around the world. He has been a soloist at the BBC Proms numerous times, having performed the Schumann, Delius and Beethoven Triple Concertos, as well as various premieres of contemporary works. British Orchestras he has performed with include the London Symphony, City of Birmingham Symphony, BBC Symphony, Royal Philharmonic and the National Youth Orchestra of Scotland. He has also directed and performed the Haydn and Boccherini concertos with the English Chamber Orchestra.

He has made a significant contribution to contemporary music, having premiered various works such as Penderecki's Cello Concerto No. 2 in 1992, H. K. Gruber's Concerto, and Andrew MacDonald's concerto. At the BBC Proms, he gave debut performances of Colin Matthews' Concerto in 1984, Henze's "Sieben Liebeslieder" in 1988 under the composer's direction, and Takemitsu's "Orion and Pleiades" in 1989. Other works by contemporary composers he regularly performs include Lutoslawski's Cello Concerto, which he has performed twice with the National Youth Orchestra of Scotland.

As well as being a prolific performer, Baillie frequently teaches both privately and in masterclasses. Currently he is professor of cello at the Bremen Hochschule in Germany, as well as International Chair in Cello at Birmingham Conservatoire and visiting professor at the Guildhall School of Music and Drama and Royal College of Music. He also makes numerous appearances at summer music courses, including Cadenza International Summer School and the Bryanston International Cello Course in the South of England.  In addition, Baillie is a regular conductor of the Marryat Players in Wimbledon.

Recordings
Alexander Baillie has made various recordings, which include Elgar's Cello Concerto, Tippett's Triple Concerto with the composer himself conducting, and a recent CD of the Gordon Crosse Concerto with the BBC Symphony Orchestra under Martyn Brabbins. He has also recorded the Cello Concerto of Dmitri Shostakovich with the Boston Philharmonic Orchestra and Britten Cello Suites and Sonata, which received the highest acclaim in the New York press. Recordings recently released and to be released soon include Jan Vriend's "The Anatomy of Passion", which was written for Baillie and duo partner James Lisney, as well as a CD of works for cello and piano by Thomas Schmidt Kowalski.

External links
Personal Website
 "Cellist.nl" Profile

See also
List of English people
List of cellists

1956 births
English classical cellists
Living people
People from Stockport
Musicians from Greater Manchester
20th-century English musicians
20th-century classical musicians
20th-century English male musicians
21st-century English musicians
21st-century classical musicians
21st-century English male musicians
Alumni of the Royal College of Music
University of Music and Performing Arts Vienna alumni
20th-century cellists
21st-century cellists